Robert G. "Bob" Donovan (born 1956) is an American Republican politician from Milwaukee County, Wisconsin.  He is a member of the Wisconsin State Assembly, representing Wisconsin's 84th Assembly district since January 2023.  He previously served 20 years on the Milwaukee Common Council and was an unsuccessful candidate for mayor of Milwaukee in 2016 and 2022.

Early life and career
Bob Donovan was born and raised in the Jackson Park neighborhood of Milwaukee, Wisconsin, and graduated from Saint Thomas More High School.  Donovan comes from a Catholic family, and originally planned to become a priest after high school.  He entered Saint Francis de Sales Seminary but left after a year.  He then attended the University of Wisconsin–Milwaukee for two years, intending to become a teacher, but also left without completing his degree.  During his college years, he had worked as a laborer during the summers at Milwaukee Solvay Coke & Gas Co., a coal processing plant.  After leaving UWM, he decided to focus on this work and became a supervisor and later plant foreman.  Milwaukee Solvay Coke went out of business in 1983 and Donovan worked a number of jobs in the years after, including security officer at Southridge Mall and later for a pest control company.

Political career

Early campaigns
Donovan first entered politics as a Republican candidate in 1982, challenging incumbent Democratic state representative Joseph Czarnezki in what was then the 17th Assembly district.  Czarnezki easily won the election, receiving 76% of the vote in the heavily Democratic district.  A few months after the election, however, Czarnezki won a special election for Wisconsin Senate, and a new special election was called in the 17th Assembly district.  Donovan ran again, and fared a bit better in the lower turnout special election, but still received only 33% of the vote.

Donovan says he was drawn to the  Republican Party by Ronald Reagan, but later admitted that this experience taught him that he didn't want to be labeled as a Republican if he wanted to be successful in Milwaukee politics.  He therefore described himself as nonpartisan for most of the next forty years.

City council
In the late 1980s and 1990s, Donovan became involved in neighborhood associations, such as the Southside Organizing Committee and the Layton Boulevard West Neighbors Association.  These groups saw their neighborhoods in decline, and were upset about the rising number of renters displacing homeowners.  They also saw their alderman, Wayne P. Frank, as unresponsive to their concerns.  Donovan decided to challenge Frank for his seat on the city council, but his 1996 campaign failed to make the ballot due to invalid nomination forms.  He ran as a write-in candidate and came close to winning.  Four years later, Frank chose not to run for an 8th term, and Donovan won the election to succeed him.

In the 2000 election, however, his opponent, G. Eddie Paez, brought up a previously unknown 1992 incident when Donovan was arrested and fined for peeping through a hole in a partition between two stalls in a men's room on the UWM campus.  According to the police report, Donovan told the arresting officer he'd frequented the restroom for years "for the purpose of either watching men masturbate, or to have sex with men in the restroom."  During the 2000 campaign, Donovan denied he made the statement and said he just noticed the person in the next stall was "acting suspicious".

As alderman, Donovan took the unusual step of opening up a district office, funded by local businesses and staffed by volunteers.  He also founded a nonprofit, the Milwaukee Alliance, which launched the south side's community prosecution unit to address neighborhood issues like absentee landlords or nuisance properties.

Donovan stepped down from Milwaukee Alliance after the United States Attorney, Steven M. Biskupic, began looking into federal funding he had secured for the nonprofit.  Ultimately, Donovan was indicted for fraud and making false statements to the United States Department of Housing and Urban Development.  At issue were several payments from the nonprofit to Donovan's wife and falsified records to hide the payments.  Also at issue was the close intermingling of Donovan's campaign apparatus and the nonprofit's employees and funds.  Ultimately, the Biskupic agreed to drop the charges after Donovan paid a fee to the city.  The deal also prohibited Donovan from any involvement in federally-funded groups for the next two years, and required him to cut all ties with the Milwaukee Alliance.  The organization ceased to exist less than a year later.

Donovan was ultimately re-elected four times as alderman for the 8th district. Because of his relatively unique conservative politics in the city government, Donovan's office became a hub for conservatives in the city seeking constituent services—even those outside of his aldermanic district.  Donovan has frequently been at-odds with his mostly Democratic colleagues in the Milwaukee Common Council, and was described as having a "large ego" and "pandering".  He announced in March 2019 that he would retire in 2020.  He subsequently moved to the neighboring suburban city of Greenfield, Wisconsin.

Mayoral races
Donovan launched his first bid for mayor of Milwaukee in 2015, challenging three-term incumbent mayor Tom Barrett in the 2016 election.  Wisconsin's mayoral races are nonpartisan, but Milwaukee Democrats sought to clearly tie Donovan to the Republican establishment.  They described Donovan as having "Scott Walker's ideas and Donald Trump's erratic behavior," and pointed out Donovan's frequent collaboration with Republican state legislators.  Donovan's past run-ins with the law were again brought up in the 2016 campaign.  Donovan ran on an anti-crime platform with the endorsement of Milwaukee's police and firefighters' unions.  Donovan was also a long-time opponent of the planned Milwaukee Streetcar.  Barrett easily prevailed with 70% of the vote in the Spring general election, in line with his previous two mayoral campaigns.

Five years later, in 2021, Barrett resigned to accept an appointment as U.S. Ambassador to Luxembourg.  A special mayoral election was set to be held concurrent with the 2022 Spring election.  Donovan again chose to enter the race, despite Milwaukee no longer being his primary residence.  He stood out in a crowded primary field as the only conservative candidate, and again ran on an anti-crime platform, calling for more police and tougher penalties for criminals.  The final vote was also nearly identical to his previous run, and interim mayor Cavalier Johnson became Milwaukee's first black mayor, receiving 71% of the vote.

Wisconsin Legislature
Around the time of the Spring 2022 election, the Wisconsin Supreme Court issued its decision in the case of Billie Johnson v. Wisconsin Elections Commission, setting new district maps for the Wisconsin Legislature.  Six-term incumbent state representative Mike Kuglitsch was drawn out of the 84th Assembly district, creating an open seat.  Within two weeks, Donovan declared his candidacy in the new 84th Assembly district.  He faced two opponents in the Republican primary, but easily won with 72% of the vote. He faced Democrat Lu Ann Bird in the general election, a former Whitnall School District board member from Hales Corners, Wisconsin.  The 84th district race was one of the closest elections in the state in 2022, and Donovan ultimately prevailed by a margin of 526 votes.

He will take office in January 2023.

Personal life and family
Bob Donovan married his wife Kathy in 1985.  They met while he was working as a security officer at Southridge mall—she was working at a clothing store.  They had two children together and Kathy brought three children from her previous marriage, all are now grown.  Bob and Kathy reside in Greenfield, Wisconsin.

Electoral history

Wisconsin Assembly (1982, 1983)

| colspan="6" style="text-align:center;background-color: #e9e9e9;"| General Election, November 2, 1982

| colspan="6" style="text-align:center;background-color: #e9e9e9;"| Special Election, June 28, 1983

Milwaukee Mayor (2016)

| colspan="6" style="text-align:center;background-color: #e9e9e9;"| Nonpartisan Primary, February 16, 2016 (top two)

| colspan="6" style="text-align:center;background-color: #e9e9e9;"| General Election, April 5, 2016

Milwaukee Mayor (2022)

| colspan="6" style="text-align:center;background-color: #e9e9e9;"| Nonpartisan Primary, February 15, 2022 (top two)

| colspan="6" style="text-align:center;background-color: #e9e9e9;"| General Election, April 5, 2022

Wisconsin Assembly (2022)

| colspan="6" style="text-align:center;background-color: #e9e9e9;"| Republican Primary, August 9, 2022

| colspan="6" style="text-align:center;background-color: #e9e9e9;"| General Election, November 8, 2022

References

External links
 Campaign website
 Official (city) website (Archived March 5, 2020)
 
 Bob Donovan at Wisconsin Vote

1956 births
Living people
Republican Party members of the Wisconsin State Assembly 
Milwaukee Common Council members
People from Greenfield, Wisconsin
20th-century American politicians
21st-century American politicians